Caryocolum transiens is a moth of the family Gelechiidae. It is found in Nepal.

The length of the forewings is about 6 mm. The ground colour of the forewings is dark brown and the hindwings are shining grey.

The larvae possibly feed on Cerastium and/or Stellaria species.

References

Moths described in 1992
transiens
Moths of Asia